Pierre Marsan (16 August 1916 – 14 August 2008) was a Monegasque sports shooter. He competed at the 1936, 1948, 1952 and 1960 Summer Olympics.

References

1916 births
2008 deaths
Monegasque male sport shooters
Olympic shooters of Monaco
Shooters at the 1936 Summer Olympics
Shooters at the 1948 Summer Olympics
Shooters at the 1952 Summer Olympics
Shooters at the 1960 Summer Olympics
Place of birth missing